Lobo, in comics, may refer to:

 Lobo (DC Comics), the alien bounty hunter
 Lobo (Dell Comics), the African-American comic book character
 Lobo the Duck, an Amalgam Comics fusion of DC's Lobo and Marvel's Howard the Duck

It may also refer to:
 Lobo Brothers, two Marvel Comics werewolves
 Maximus Lobo, a Marvel Comics character

See also
Lobo (disambiguation)